Edita Aradinović (born 30 June 1993), often simply known as Edita, is a Serbian singer and songwriter. She rose to fame as the lead vocalist of the pop-folk girl band Ministarke in 2013, before pursuing a solo career five years later.

Life and career
Aradinović was born and raised in Belgrade, FR Yugoslavia (modern-day Serbia) into a Muslim Albanian family. Her father Isa hails from Medveđa while her mother Florija hails from Suva Reka. She is of Egyptian ancestery through her mother. Her maternal grandfather moved to Belgrade in the late 1950s. She has noted Albanian as her mother tongue. Her older sister Indira Aradinović, better known as Indy, is also a well-known turbo-folk singer. Her maternal grandmother had a twin sister, who was the mother of icons of Serbian dance music, Đole and Gagi Đogani. Edita developed a passion for music through Serbian turbo-folk and also American jazz music, citing Sam Cooke and Aretha Franklin as her biggest influences.

Following an unsuccessful audition for the televised singing competition Zvezde Granda, Edita released her debut song "Overila" (Checked) in 2012, which was notable for the guest appearance of Shakira's half-brother, Robin Mebarak, in the music video. She then became a lead singer of the girl group Ministarke in 2013. The group broke through after releasing duets "Poplava" (Flood) with Aco Pejović, "Uno momento" (One Moment) with Severina and "Zver" (Beast) with Saša Matić. In 2015, Ministarke released their debut album titled Kiseonik (Oxygen).

In 2017, Edita appeared on the fourth season of the reality talent show Tvoje lice zvuči poznato, finishing in the third place. She would release three more singles with Ministarke—"Moje jedino" (My Only One; a Dajana Penezić cover), "Zauzeto" (Engaged) and "Tutto completo" (No Vacancy)—before leaving the band to pursue a solo career at the beginning of the following year. While announcing her departure and before embarking on a solo career, she revealed that she underwent three vocal cord surgeries. She joined IDJTunes and released a duet with Aco Pejović, titled "Blud i nemoral" (Fornication and Immorality), on 10 October 2018. On 7 May 2019 she released her solo single "Magnum", followed up by "Životinje" (Animals) on 30 July. In October, she returned for the fifth season of Tvoje lice zvuči poznato. Her imitation of Greek singer Eleni Foureira in the first episode caught attention of Foureira herself, who praised it on Instagram. Edita finished her 2019 by releasing a collaboration with Sunaj Ibraimović, a cover of "Jugoslovenka" (Yugoslav Girl) by Lepa Brena.

In August 2020, she released a cover of "Kokuzna vremena" (Broke Times) by Dino Merlin as part of Zvezde pevaju zvezde Xtra project by Radio S. On 23 September, Serbian singer Marina Visković released her new single "Ljubi me tu" (Kiss Me Here), entirely written by Aradinović.

On 14 April 2022, Aradinović announced her debut solo studio album, titled 08, and released the lead single "Egomanija" (Egomania) a day later. In June 2022, she revealed she had undergone a vocal cord surgery that significantly changed her vocal timbre.

In summer 2022, she released the single "Pucaj mi u srce" (Shoot me in the heart). Composed by Coby, her single gained significant popularity in the social media platform TikTok.

Discography

Singles

As lead artist

As featured artist

Songwriting credits

References

1993 births
Living people
Singers from Belgrade
21st-century Serbian women singers
Serbian turbo-folk singers
Serbian pop singers
Serbian mezzo-sopranos
Albanians in Serbia
Serbian Muslims